The Sarajevo Open is an international figure skating competition held annually, usually in February, in Sarajevo, Bosnia and Herzegovina. Medals may be awarded in men's singles, ladies' singles, and pairs on the senior, junior, novice, and other levels.

Senior medalists

Men

Ladies

Pairs

Junior medalists

Men

Ladies

Pairs

Advanced novice medalists

Men

Ladies

References

External links 
 Events at the International Skating Union
 Sarajevo Open at the Skating Federation Of Bosnia And Herzegovina

International figure skating competitions hosted by Bosnia and Herzegovina